Po Klaong Mah Nai (?–1627), also spelled Po Klong Menai, Po Klău Manai or Po Klong M'hnai, was the king of Panduranga Champa, ruling from 1622 to 1627.

He was an officer of Champa with the noble rank Maha Taha. He was a Muslim, in 1622, he killed the Hindu king Po Ehklang and seized the throne. He chased off visiting Jesuits. In the years 1622 to 1630, Dutch merchant ships were attacked by "Malay" soldiers in South China Sea; actually they were attacked by Chams, not Malays. The country was in chaos, bitter fighting between Cham Hindus and Cham Muslims provoked. In 1627, his throne was succeeded by a Churu chief, Po Rome.

The Po Klaong Mah Nai Temple is in Phan Rí, about 15 km from Bắc Bình District, Bình Thuận Province.

References

Kings of Champa
1627 deaths
Year of birth unknown
Muslim monarchs